Habla Union is a union of Basail Upazila, Tangail District, Bangladesh. It is situated at 12 km southeast of Tangail.

Demographics

According to Population Census 2011 performed by Bangladesh Bureau of Statistics, The total population of Habla union is 31,814. There are  7,491 households in total.

Education

The literacy rate of Habla Union is 57% (Male-60.5%, Female-53.9%).

See also
 Union Councils of Tangail District

References

Populated places in Dhaka Division
Populated places in Tangail District
Unions of Basail Upazila